The Hecla class formed the backbone of the Royal Navy's ocean survey fleet from the mid-1960s.

Design
The hull design was based on that of the RRS Discovery and the Hecla class were built to commercial standards costing £1.25 million each.  They carried two small survey craft, a launch, a Land Rover and a Wasp helicopter, for which there was a flight deck and hangar.  They were chiefly funded from the Polaris Submarine Ballistic Nuclear Missile programme, with their major task to carry out regular oceanographic observations essential for the Polaris submarines to hide in thermal layers.

Special modifications
Besides the strengthened hull for work in ice and the provision of air conditioning necessary for work in all climates, they had modifications particular for a scientific vessel: wet and dry laboratories; a survey chartroom and photographic darkroom; oceanographic winches for deep seawater analysis and coring; stabilisers and a bow thruster, which enabled the ship to maintain her position when stopped for scientific observations.
All 4 Royal Navy vessels were fitted with an Inertial Navigation System for mid-Ocean positioning. 'Drift' was corrected by taking satellite fixes from the Transit Doppler Sat Nav. 
Each vessel, due to their requirement to operate mid-Ocean, was equipped with a sick bay with a 2-bed ward and an operating theatre with X-Ray machine. Every vessel carried a Surgeon-Lieutenant and Leading Medical Assistant.
In the 80's and 90's, 'Hecla' and 'Hecate' were equipped to make Gravity Free Air Anomaly observations over the mid-Atlantic ridge for the US Department of Defence 'Nav Star' GPS constellation of satellites.

Ships in class

Service

A fourth ship,  was ordered in the early 1970s.  Apart from HMS Hecate, they all saw service as hospital ships in the Falklands War, while Herald and Hecla also served in the Gulf War and the former as a temporary Antarctic Patrol Ship in 1991 and 1992.  Hecate saw service as the temporary Antarctic Patrol Ship in 1982 after being painted grey and fitted with AA guns in Gibraltar.  Hecate was the first Royal Navy vessel to visit South America following the Falklands conflict. During the conflict, Hecla, commanded by Captain Geoffrey Hope RN, with Lt. Cdr. Ward as XO, ferried Argentinian prisoners of war to Montevideo. Being the first vessel of the conflict to be in the glare of the world media, she gained a high public profile out of proportion to her ambulance ship role. Hydra was also outfitted as an ambulance ship whereas Herald was equipped as a casualty reception station on a par with SS Uganda.

A fifth Hecla-class vessel, SAS Protea (A324) was ordered by the South African Navy and commissioned on 23 May 1972. As of 2017, Protea remains in service.

Hydra was sold to Indonesia Navy in 1986 and renamed KRI Dewa Kembar-932. As of 2017, Dewa Kembar remains in service.

In 1969, commanded by Captain David Haslam (who retired after 10 years as Hydrographer in 1985), she landed a party who hoisted the Union Flag on Rockall, which significantly extended the UK's territory.

Nomenclature
The first three ships in the class were named for the three paddle-wheel Hydra-class sloops, two of which ( and ) were fitted out as survey ships from around 1860.

Gallery

See also
 List of survey vessels of the Royal Navy

References 

Auxiliary research ship classes
 
Ship classes of the Royal Navy